Cephalofovea clandestina is a species of ovoviviparous velvet worm in the family Peripatopsidae. This species has 15 pairs of oncopods (legs) and lives in rotting logs and leaf litter. The type locality is Kanangra-Boyd National Park, New South Wales, Australia. Like all members of the genus Cephalofovea, both sexes of C. clandestina have a furrow on the head, between the antennae, which the male everts to carry his spermatophore to the female.

References 

Onychophorans of Australasia
Onychophoran species
Animals described in 1995